Susumu Sugiyama (born 10 April 1932) is a Japanese alpine skier. He competed in three events at the 1956 Winter Olympics.

References

1932 births
Living people
Japanese male alpine skiers
Olympic alpine skiers of Japan
Alpine skiers at the 1956 Winter Olympics
Sportspeople from Nagano Prefecture
20th-century Japanese people